"Romansyia" "(Romance)" is a song recorded by the Lebanese singer Amal Hijazi in 2002 and released as a single in 2003, from Hijazi's album Zaman and produced by Dilara Master Production.

Upon the single's release in mid-2003, it quickly shot up to the number one spot in Lebanon, Egypt, Algeria and Syria. "Romansyia" received a mainly positive response from music critics and its success established Hijazi as one of the most wanted performers in both Egypt and Lebanon, despite the serious competition between a number of female singers. 

"Romansyia" became a major club hit in a number of countries around the Middle East and attracted generally positive comments from reviewers. Upon its initial radio airplay, it reached the number one spot on a number of Lebanese and Egypt radio channels. In addition, the success was highly recognized in countries like Jordan, Iraq, Malaysia and Singapore.

The music video of "Romansyia" also attracted a number of positive reviews by most music critics. It was filmed in Lebanon, under the direction of Mirna Khayat. The video showcases Hijazi in various dance sequences. The opening scene begins with the performer standing in front of a mirror and admiring herself. The scene next shifts towards a swimming pool area where Hijazi begins an elaborate solo dance. The video ends with Hijazi performing at a concert in front of fans. 

2003 singles
Amal Hijazi songs
2002 songs